Keystone Air Service Ltd. was an airline that served Manitoba, Canada, with charter services to anywhere in North America. Keystone had been flying since 1985 and provided air charter service to as far north as Alert, Nunavut. In 2015 merged into Wings over Kississing.

Destinations
Anywhere in North America

Fleet
The Keystone Air Service fleet included:

Incidents and accidents

On September 15, 2015, a Piper PA-31 with two crew and six passengers crashed 2 kilometers from Thompson, Manitoba airport shortly after takeoff. All eight people were transported to hospital. The crash was caused by the fueler mistakenly filling the plane with jet fuel, instead of the required Avgas.
In 2012, a Piper PA-31 carrying five passengers stalled on final approach and crashed near North Spirit Lake, Ontario due to adverse weather and icing conditions. The aircraft was destroyed and four passengers (including the pilot) were killed, while one passenger sustained serious injuries.
In 2002, a Piper PA-31-350 ran out of fuel and crashed at an intersection in Winnipeg, MB after a missed approach to Winnipeg International Airport runway 36. All seven passengers and several occupants in a vehicle on the ground were injured in the crash, and one passenger subsequently died from injuries.
In 2001, a Piper PA-31 landed gear up on runway 13 in Winnipeg, MB. In a post-accident investigation, the gear was found to have been in the fully retracted position at the time of landing and no mechanical abnormality was found.
In 2000, a Piper PA-31 crashed in a wooded area 2 miles from the Winnipeg International Airport after the right engine failed due to substantial water in the fuel tank.

See also 
 List of defunct airlines of Canada

References

External links

Keystone Air Service
Winnipeg Esso Avitat
St. Andrews Airport
 cbs.ca

Regional airlines of Manitoba
Airlines established in 1985
Defunct airlines of Canada
Airlines disestablished in 2015
1985 establishments in Manitoba
Canadian companies disestablished in 2015
Canadian companies established in 1985